Ybbs is a river in Lower Austria.

Its source is located on the Zellerrain Pass near Mariazell. In the beginning, the river is called , then onwards from the border between Lower Austria and Styria up to Lunz am See it is called . From there until its confluence to the Danube at Ybbs an der Donau, it is finally called Ybbs.

Along the river there are many metal and lumber industry plants.

The most important towns on the Ybbs are Lunz am See, Göstling an der Ybbs, Hollenstein an der Ybbs, Opponitz, Ybbsitz, Waidhofen an der Ybbs, Amstetten, and Ybbs an der Donau.

The valley of the river Ybbs is called: Ybbs Valley, or Ybbs Field. In 788, it was the site of a battle, between Franks and Avars.

See also

 Ybbs Valley Railway

References

Sources

 

Rivers of Lower Austria
Rivers of Austria